Robert Cope (1679 – 17 March 1753) was an Irish Member of Parliament.

Biography
He was the son of Anthony Cope, Dean of Elphin, by his wife Elizabeth, daughter of Henry Cope of Loughgall. He was educated at Trinity College, Dublin.

He sat in the Irish House of Commons for Lisburn from 1711 to 1713 and for county Armagh from 1713 to 1714, and from 1727 until his death. In 1736, he was High Sheriff of Armagh.

Cope was married twice: firstly, in 1707, to Lettice, daughter of Arthur Brownlow, and secondly in 1711 to Elizabeth, daughter of Sir William Fownes. By his second wife he had several children, including Anthony, Dean of Armagh, and Arthur, whose son Robert Camden Cope was also MP for Armagh.

References

See also 

 Cope family

1679 births
1753 deaths
Alumni of Trinity College Dublin
Members of the Middle Temple
High Sheriffs of Armagh
Politicians from County Armagh
Irish MPs 1703–1713
Irish MPs 1713–1714
Irish MPs 1727–1760
Members of the Parliament of Ireland (pre-1801) for County Antrim constituencies
Members of the Parliament of Ireland (pre-1801) for County Armagh constituencies